Pseudocaeciliidae is a family of Psocodea (formerly Psocoptera) belonging to the suborder Psocomorpha. The name stems from a superficial resemblance to the  distantly related family Caeciliusidae (formerly Caeciliidae). The family is closely related to the family Philotarsidae, both within the infraorder Philotarsetae.

Sources

Lienhard, C. & Smithers, C. N. 2002. Psocoptera (Insecta): World Catalogue and Bibliography. Instrumenta Biodiversitatis, vol. 5. Muséum d'histoire naturelle, Genève.

 
Psocoptera families
Psocomorpha